Jodaqiyeh or Jodaqayeh or Jedaqayah or Jedaqayeh may refer to:
 Jodaqayeh, East Azerbaijan
 Jedaqayah, Kurdistan
 Jedaqayah, West Azerbaijan
 Jodaqiyeh, Zanjan